Nellie Sloggett (29 December 1851 in Padstow, Cornwall, UK – 1923) was an author and folklorist who wrote under the names Enys Tregarthen and Nellie Cornwall.

Life and work 
Nellie Sloggett was raised mainly by her mother, Sarah Sloggett, in Padstow; her father was at sea.

At 17 she developed a spinal illness and was paralysed for the rest of her life. She began to keep diaries about flowers, the changing seasons, and birds and other creatures, all observed from her bedside window. This practice eventually led to the writing and publication of her first book, Daddy Longlegs, and His White Heath Flower, in 1885, under the pen-name Nellie Cornwall.

Later she came to devote much of her attention to Cornish folklore and legend. She collected and recorded many stories about the Piskey folk, fairies of Cornish myth and legend. She published most of her works in this category under her better-known pen-name of Enys Tregarthen.

After Tregarthen's death, the writer Elizabeth Yates edited her extensive unpublished materials for publication.

Works

As Nellie Cornwall
 Joyce's Little Maid (1900)
 The Maid of the Storm (1900)
 The Hill of Fire  (1901)
 The Little Don of Oxford (1902)
 Little Gladwise: the Story of a Waif  (1909)
 Tamsin Rosewarne and her Burdens (1910)
 Twice Rescued
 Halvard Halworsen
 Granny Tresawna's Story

As Enys Tregarthen
 The Doll Who Came Alive (1942) 
 Pixie Folklore & Legends  (reprinted 1995)  
 Padstow's Faery Folk (paperback) 
 
 The House of the Sleeping Winds and Other Stories (1911)
 The White Ring (1949)

References

External links

 
 
 
 
 Encyclopedia - Britannica Online Encyclopedia at www.britannica.com 
 
 

1851 births
1923 deaths
People from Padstow
Writers from Cornwall
Folklorists